Alberta Neiswanger Hall (born 1870), also known as Alberta N. Burton, was an American composer of children's songs and books. She wrote musical settings for 26 poems in "The Songs of Father Goose" by L. Frank Baum in 1900. She was married to Edmund F. Burton, a physician who left medicine for the study of Christian Science. She also converted to the religion.

Her other works include musical settings for Lizette Woodworth Reese and Percy Blackmer, as well as her own original lyrics, and have been called "full of genuine melodic charm and no little skill of harmonic workmanship."

Selected works 
 The Song of Father Goose (1900) – with L. Frank Baum and W. W. Denslow
 The Fruits of the Garden (May 1909) – article in The Christian Science Journal
 The Burro (1916) – arranged by Clarence C. Robinson
 New stories : (Community life), a second reader (1926) – with Marjorie Hardy and Matilda Breuer
 Happy days out west for Littlebits (1927) – with Edith Janice Craine and Dorothy Lake Gregory

References

External links 
Burton, Alberta N. Testimony Christian Science Sentinel Vol. 36, Issue 46. (July 14, 1934). Retrieved May 6, 2013
"Seven Songs from Out-of-Doors", copyright Alberta N. Burton, Dec. 15, 1942 Catalog of Copyright Entries: Musical compositions, Part 3. (1943). Retrieved May 7, 2013

American women composers
American composers
American women writers
Converts to Christian Science
American Christian Scientists
1870 births
Year of death missing